Las Pedroñeras is a small town and municipality in the province of Cuenca, in the central region of the autonomous community of Castile-La Mancha, southwestern Spain.

It was founded around 1500, and it is believed that the name comes from "Pedro" (Stone in Spanish) + "Heras" (Farming Field in Spanish).

Las Pedroñeras has about 7000 people in the winter and 10,000 in the summer. Official data from INE is 7,058 inhabitants.

Typical products

The main activity is garlic farming and wine making. In Spain Pedroñeras is called the "Garlic Capital", because the good quality of its Ajos Morados (purple garlic), publicized on television by Karlos Arguiñano, a Spanish chef. Every summer the International Garlic Congress takes place in the town.

References

External links

In Spanish 
 Las Pedroñeras Town Hall
 Las Pedroñeras
 News about Las Pedroñeras
 Las Pedroñeras Street Map
 International Garlic Congress
 Las Pedroñeras

In English or other languages 
 Info about the Pedroñeras' Garlic
 Spanish Garlic from Las Pedroñeras
 Garlic

Pedroneras, las